Argo is a 2012 American historical drama thriller film directed, produced by and starring Ben Affleck. The screenplay, written by Chris Terrio, was adapted from the 1999 memoir The Master of Disguise by U.S. Central Intelligence Agency operative Tony Mendez, and the 2007 Wired article "The Great Escape: How the CIA Used a Fake Sci-Fi Flick to Rescue Americans from Tehran" by Joshuah Bearman. The film deals with the "Canadian Caper", in which Mendez led the rescue of six U.S. diplomats from Tehran, Iran, under the guise of filming a science fiction film during the 1979–1981 Iran hostage crisis.

The film, which also has Bryan Cranston, Alan Arkin, and John Goodman in supporting roles, was released in the United States on October 12, 2012. It was produced by Grant Heslov, Affleck and George Clooney.

Argo was praised for the acting (particularly Arkin and Goodman's), Affleck's direction, Terrio's screenplay, the editing, and Desplat's score. Commentators and participants in the actual operation criticized failures in historical accuracy. The film received seven nominations at the 85th Academy Awards and won three, for Best Picture, Best Adapted Screenplay, and Best Film Editing.

The film also earned five Golden Globe Award nominations: it won Best Motion Picture – Drama and Best Director, and Alan Arkin was nominated for Best Supporting Actor – Motion Picture. It won Outstanding Performance by a Cast in a Motion Picture at the 19th Screen Actors Guild Awards, and Arkin was nominated for Outstanding Performance by a Male Actor in a Supporting Role. It also won Best Film, Best Editing and Best Director at the 66th British Academy Film Awards, Los Angeles Film Critics Association Awards for Best Screenplay, and 37th Hochi Film Award for Best International Picture.

Plot
On November 4, 1979, Iranian Islamists storm the United States embassy in Tehran in retaliation for President Jimmy Carter giving the Shah, a dictator put in place by Western powers, asylum in the U.S. during the Iranian Revolution, for cancer treatment. Sixty-six of the embassy staff are taken as hostages, but six avoid capture and are sheltered in the home of Canadian ambassador Ken Taylor.

With the escapees' situation kept secret, the U.S. State Department begins to explore options for exfiltrating them from Iran. Tony Mendez, a U.S. Central Intelligence Agency exfiltration specialist, is brought in for a consultation. He criticizes the proposals but is at a loss when asked for an alternative. While on the phone with his son, he is inspired by watching Battle for the Planet of the Apes and begins plans for creating a cover story for the escapees: that they are Canadian filmmakers who are in Iran scouting exotic locations for a science-fiction film.

Mendez contacts John Chambers, a Hollywood make-up artist who had previously worked for the CIA. Chambers puts Mendez in touch with film producer Lester Siegel. Together, they set up a phony film production company, publicize their plans, and successfully establish the pretense of developing Argo, a "science fantasy adventure" in the style of Star Wars, to lend the cover story credibility. Meanwhile, the escapees grow restless. The revolutionaries reassemble embassy photographs shredded before the takeover and realize that some personnel are unaccounted for.

Posing as a producer for Argo, Mendez enters Iran under the alias Kevin Harkins and meets with the six escapees. He provides them with Canadian passports and fake identities. Although afraid to trust Mendez's scheme, they reluctantly go along, knowing that he is risking his own life too. A scouting visit to the bazaar to maintain their cover story takes a bad turn when they are harassed by a hostile shopkeeper, but their Iranian culture contact hustles them away from the hostile crowd.

Mendez is told the operation has been cancelled in favor of planned military rescue of the hostages. He pushes ahead anyway, forcing his boss Jack O'Donnell to hastily re-obtain authorization for the mission and rebook their cancelled tickets on a Swissair flight. Tensions rise at the airport, where the escapees' new ticket reservations are confirmed only at the last minute, and the head guard's call to the fake production company in Hollywood is answered only at the last second. The escapees board the plane and at about the same time, the airport authorities are alerted to the ruse. They try to stop them but the plane is able to take off.

To protect the hostages remaining in Tehran from retaliation, all U.S. involvement in the rescue is suppressed, and full credit is given to the Canadian government and its ambassador (who shuts down the embassy and leaves Iran with his wife as the operation is underway). The ambassador's Iranian housekeeper, who had known about the Americans and lied to the revolutionaries to protect them, escapes to Iraq. Mendez is awarded the Intelligence Star, but due to the mission's classified nature, he receives the medal in secret and has to return it afterward. Mendez returns to his wife and son in Virginia. The film ends by explaining what happened after the depicted events: the hostages were freed after 444 days, Mendez and Chambers remained friends until Chambers' death in 2001, Bill Clinton returned Mendez's star in 1997 after the Canadian Caper is declassified, and that he lives with his family in rural Maryland.

As the credits roll, President Jimmy Carter is heard commenting on the operation.

Cast
 Ben Affleck as CIA Agent Tony Mendez
 Bryan Cranston as CIA Deputy Director Jack O'Donnell
 Alan Arkin as Lester Siegel
 John Goodman as John Chambers
 Victor Garber as Ken Taylor
 Tate Donovan as Rob Anders
 Clea DuVall as Cora Lijek
 Adrienne Barbeau as Nina
 Scoot McNairy as Joe Stafford
 Rory Cochrane as Lee Schatz
 Christopher Denham as Mark Lijek
 Kerry Bishé as Kathy Stafford
 Kyle Chandler as Chief of Staff Hamilton Jordan
 Chris Messina as CIA Officer Malinov
 Željko Ivanek as Robert Pender
 Titus Welliver as Jon Bates
 Philip Baker Hall as CIA Director Stansfield Turner
 Bob Gunton as Secretary of State Cyrus Vance
 Richard Kind as Max Klein
 Richard Dillane as OSS Officer Nicholls
 Omid Abtahi as Reza Borhani
 Page Leong as Pat Taylor
 Farshad Farahat as Azizi, Checkpoint #3
 Sheila Vand as Sahar

Production

Argo is based on the "Canadian Caper" that took place during the Iran hostage crisis in 1979 and 1980. Chris Terrio wrote the screenplay based on Joshuah Bearman's 2007 article "How the CIA Used a Fake Sci-Fi Flick to Rescue Americans from Tehran," which was published in Wired.

In 2007, the producers George Clooney, Grant Heslov and David Klawans set up a project based on the article. Affleck's participation was announced in February 2011. The following June, Alan Arkin was the first person cast in the film. After the rest of the roles were cast, filming began in Los Angeles in August 2011. Additional filming took place in McLean, Virginia; Washington, D.C.; and Istanbul. The scene in which Mendez drives up to and walks into the CIA headquarters lobby was filmed with permission at the CIA's original headquarters building in Virginia; all other scenes set at the CIA were filmed in the basement of the Los Angeles Times Building.

As a historical piece, the film made use of archival news footage from ABC, CBS and NBC; and included popular songs from the era, such as "Little T&A" by The Rolling Stones (an anachronism, as it was not released until the following year), "Sultans of Swing" by Dire Straits, "Dance the Night Away" by Van Halen and "When the Levee Breaks" by Led Zeppelin. For its part, Warner Bros. used its 1972–1984 production logo featuring the "Big W" logo designed by Saul Bass for Warner Communications to open the film and painted on its studio lot's famed water tower the logo of The Burbank Studios (the facility's name during the 1970s and 1980s when Warner shared it with Columbia Pictures).

The screenplay used by the CIA to create their cover story was an adaptation of Roger Zelazny's 1967 novel Lord of Light. Producer Barry Geller had spearheaded an earlier attempt to produce the film using the original title. After that production attempt failed, the screenplay was renamed Argo and used by the CIA.

According to Tony Mendez, Studio Six—the phony Hollywood production office he helped create at the core of the CIA plan—proved so convincing that even weeks after the rescue was complete and the office had folded, 26 scripts were delivered to its address, including one from Steven Spielberg.

In April 2016, research by VICE, based on documents received under the Freedom of Information Act, revealed that the CIA's public relations arm was involved in the production of the 2012 Argo, just as it provided information to a number of other American entertainment productions (such as the well-established case of the 2012 film Zero Dark Thirty).

Soundtrack

Release and reception

Critical response
Argo was acclaimed by critics, praising Ben Affleck's direction, the cast (especially Arkin and Goodman), the script and the editing. Rotten Tomatoes gives the film an approval rating of 96%, based on 358 reviews, with an average rating of 8.40/10. The website's critical consensus reads, "Tense, exciting and often darkly comic, Argo recreates a historical event with vivid attention to detail and finely wrought characters." On Metacritic, the film has a score of 86 out of 100, based on 45 reviews, indicating "universal acclaim". CinemaScore reported that audiences gave the film a rare "A+" grade.

Naming Argo one of the best 11 films of 2012, critic Stephen Holden of The New York Times wrote: "Ben Affleck's seamless direction catapults him to the forefront of Hollywood filmmakers turning out thoughtful entertainment." The Washington Times said it felt "like a movie from an earlier era — less frenetic, less showy, more focused on narrative than sensation," but that the script included "too many characters that he doesn't quite develop."

Writing in the Chicago Sun-Times, Roger Ebert said, 
Ebert gave the film four out of four stars, calling it "spellbinding" and "surprisingly funny," and chose it as the best film of the year, the last film he would choose for this honor before his death in 2013. He also correctly predicted that it would win the Academy Award for Best Picture, following its presentation at the Toronto International Film Festival.

Literary critic Stanley Fish says that the film is a standard caper film in which "some improbable task has to be pulled off by a combination of ingenuity, training, deception and luck." He goes on to describe the film's structure: "(1) the presentation of the scheme to reluctant and unimaginative superiors, (2) the transformation of a ragtag bunch of ne'er-do-wells and wackos into a coherent, coordinated unit and (3) the carrying out of the task."

Although he thinks the film is good at building and sustaining suspense, he concludes,

Reaction by Iranians
Abolhassan Banisadr, foreign minister and then president during the incident, argued that the movie does not take into account the fact that most of the cabinet members advocated freeing all the American personnel quickly. Jian Ghomeshi, a Canadian writer and radio figure of Iranian descent, thought the film had a "deeply troubling portrayal of the Iranian people." Ghomeshi asserted "among all the rave reviews, virtually no one in the mainstream media has called out [the] unbalanced depiction of an entire ethnic national group, and the broader implications of the portrait." He also suggested that the timing of the film was poor, as American and Iranian political relations were at a low point. University of Michigan history professor Juan Cole had a similar assessment, writing that the film's narrative fails to provide adequate historical context for the events it portrays, and such errors of omission lead all of the Iranian characters in the film to be depicted as ethnic stereotypes. A November 3, 2012 article in the Los Angeles Times claimed that the film had received very little attention in Tehran, though Masoumeh Ebtekar, who was the spokesperson of the students who took the hostages and called only "Tehran Mary" in the film's credits, said that the film did not show "the real reasons behind the event." The film also ignores the importance of the date of the Embassy takeover. Mark Bowen, in his book on the subject, noted that November 4 was recognized as National Student's Day to acknowledge the student protesters killed by the Shah's police the year before. He also pointed out that this was the same date that the Ayatollah Khomeini was exiled 15 years before.

Bootleg DVDs have become popular and are estimated at "several hundreds of thousands" of copies. Interpretations of the film's popularity in Iran have varied, ranging from the fact that the movie portrays the excesses of the revolution and the hostage crisis, which had been long glorified in Iran, to Iranians viewing it as a reminder of what caused the poor relations with America and the ensuing cost to Iran, decades after the embassy takeover. The high DVD sales suggests a form of silent protest against the government's ongoing hostility to relations with America.

Top ten lists
Professional reviewers ranked the film with other releases for 2012, as follows:

Box office
Argo earned $136 million in the United States, and $96.3 million in other territories, for a worldwide total of $232.3 million.

The film debuted in second place with $19.5 million, then made $16.4 million in its sophomore weekend. In its third weekend the film made $12.1 million, finishing in first place.

Home media
The film was released in North America on February 19, 2013, on DVD and Blu-ray Disc.

Accolades

The film was nominated for seven Academy Awards and won three, for Best Picture, Best Adapted Screenplay and Best Film Editing. Affleck was not nominated for Best Director, and following the announcement of the nominations, Bradley Cooper, who was nominated for his leading performance in Silver Linings Playbook, declared: "Ben Affleck got robbed." This opinion was shared by the ceremony's host Seth MacFarlane and Quentin Tarantino, whose film Django Unchained was nominated in several categories.

Entertainment Weekly wrote about this controversy:

Historical inaccuracies

Canadian versus CIA roles
After the film was previewed at the 2012 Toronto International Film Festival, many critics said that it unfairly glorified the CIA's role and minimized the Canadian government's role (particularly that of Ambassador Taylor) in the extraction operation. Maclean's asserted that "the movie rewrites history at Canada's expense, making Hollywood and the CIA the saga's heroic saviours while Taylor is demoted to a kindly concierge." The postscript text said that the CIA let Taylor take the credit for political purposes, which some critics thought implied that he did not deserve the accolades he received. In response to this criticism, Affleck changed the postscript text to read: "The involvement of the CIA complemented efforts of the Canadian embassy to free the six held in Tehran. To this day the story stands as an enduring model of international co-operation between governments." The Toronto Star wrote, "Even that hardly does Canada justice."

In a CNN interview, former U.S. president Jimmy Carter addressed the controversy: 
Taylor noted, "In reality, Canada was responsible for the six and the CIA was a junior partner. But I realize this is a movie and you have to keep the audience on the edge of their seats." In the film, Taylor is shown as having been ordered to close down the Canadian embassy. This did not happen, and the Canadians never considered abandoning the six Americans who had taken refuge under their protection.

Affleck asserted: 

After his death, The Washington Post described Taylor as the "main hero" of the Iran hostage escape, quoting former president Jimmy Carter in doing so. In 1981, Taylor was presented with the Congressional Gold Medal by President Ronald Reagan. Nonetheless, the significance of his role was downplayed in the film.

British and New Zealand roles
Upon its release in October 2012, the film was criticized for its suggestion that British and New Zealand embassies had turned away the American diplomats in Tehran. In fact both embassies, together with the Canadians, helped the Americans. The British had initially hosted the American diplomats; however, the location was deemed unsafe as the British embassy itself had been targeted and surrounded by mobs and all involved officials from the various nations believed the Canadian ambassador's residence to be a safer location. New Zealand diplomats organized a place for the diplomats to hide if they needed to change their location, and drove the Americans to the airport when they made their escape from Tehran. British diplomats also assisted other American hostages beyond the escaped group of six. Bob Anders, the U.S. consular agent played in the film by Tate Donovan, said, "They put their lives on the line for us. We were all at risk. I hope no one in Britain will be offended by what's said in the film. The British were good to us and we're forever grateful."

Sir John Graham, the then-British ambassador to Iran, said, 
 The then-British chargé d'affaires in Tehran said that, had the Americans been discovered in the British embassy, "I can assure you we'd all have been for the high jump." Martin Williams, secretary to Sir John Graham in Iran at the time, was the one who found the Americans, after searching for them in his own British car (the only Austin Maxi in Iran) and first sheltered them in his own house.

Affleck is quoted as saying to The Sunday Telegraph: "I struggled with this long and hard, because it casts Britain and New Zealand in a way that is not totally fair. But I was setting up a situation where you needed to get a sense that these six people had nowhere else to go. It does not mean to diminish anyone."
On March 12, 2013, the New Zealand House of Representatives censured Affleck by unanimously agreeing to the following motion, initiated by New Zealand First leader Winston Peters:
{{blockquote|... this House acknowledge[s] with gratitude the efforts of former New Zealand diplomats Chris Beeby and Richard Sewell in assisting American hostages in Tehran during the hostage crisis in 1979, and express[es] its regret that the director of the movie Argo saw fit to mislead the world about what actually happened during that crisis when, in reality, our courageous diplomats' inspirational actions were of significant help to the American hostages and deserve the factual and historical record to be corrected.|author=|title=|source=}}

Imminent danger to the group
In the film, the diplomats face suspicious glances from Iranians whenever they go out in public, and appear close to being caught at many steps along the way to their freedom. In reality, the diplomats never appeared to be in imminent danger. Taylor's wife bought three sets of plane tickets from three different airlines ahead of time, without any issues.
 The film depicts a dramatic last-minute cancellation of the mission by the Carter administration and Mendez declaring he will proceed with the mission. Carter delayed authorization by only 30 minutes, and that was before Mendez had left Europe for Iran.
 The film portrays a tense situation when the crew tries to board the plane, and their identities are nearly discovered. No such confrontation with security officials took place at the departure gate.
 The film has a dramatic chase sequence as the plane takes off; this did not occur. As Mark Lijek described it, "Fortunately for us, there were very few Revolutionary Guards in the area. It is why we turned up for a flight at 5.30 in the morning; even they weren't zealous enough to be there that early. The truth is the immigration officers barely looked at us and we were processed out in the regular way. We got on the flight to Zurich and then we were taken to the US ambassador's residence in Bern. It was that straightforward."

Other inaccuracies
The film contains other historical inaccuracies:
 The screenplay does not include the six days Bob Anders, Mark and Cora Lijek and Joe and Kathy Stafford were on the run before taking refuge with the Canadians nor where Lee Schatz was until he joined the group at John and Zena Sheardown's home.
 The screenplay has the escapees—Mark and Cora Lijek, Bob Anders, Lee Schatz, and Joe and Kathy Stafford—settling down to enforced cohabitation at the residence of the Canadian ambassador Ken Taylor. In reality, the group of five (Lee Schatz joined the Lijeks and Bob Anders about ten days later) was split between the Taylor house and the home of another Canadian official, John Sheardown and his wife Zena. It was in fact the friendship between Bob Anders and John Sheardown that led Bob to call John to seek sanctuary for the group when the haven with Thai cook Sam (Somchai) began to unravel. John's response to Bob was, "Why didn't you call sooner?"
 "It's not true we could never go outside. John Sheardown's house had an interior courtyard with a garden and we could walk there freely," Mark Lijek says.
 Lester Siegel, played by Alan Arkin, is not a real person. His name and some contribution are based on Robert Sidell's while his personality is based on Jack Warner's.
 In the depiction of a frantic effort by CIA headquarters, in Langley, to get President Jimmy Carter to re-authorize the mission so that previously purchased airline tickets would still be valid, a CIA officer is portrayed as getting the White House telephone operator to connect him to Chief of Staff Hamilton Jordan by impersonating a representative of the school attended by Jordan's children. In reality, Jordan was unmarried and had no children at the time. 
The film depicts Mendez discovering the script with the title of Argo. In reality the script was titled Lord of Light, based on the book of the same name by Roger Zelazny. The CIA changed the title to Argo.Higgins, Bill; Kit, Borys. "Argo's odd Hollywood history." Hollywood Reporter. October 5, 2012: 64. eLibrary. March 1, 2013. 
 Comic book artist Jack Kirby did not do his storyboard work for the fabricated CIA film production. He created concept arts when there was an attempt to produce Lord of Light a few years before the Iranian hostage situation.
 The Hollywood Sign is shown dilapidated as it had been in the 1970s. The sign had been repaired in 1978, two years before the events described in the film.
 The Swissair flight that took Mendez and the hostage group out of Tehran is shown operated with a Boeing 747-300, a type which entered service in 1983, and is painted in a livery that Swissair introduced in 1980. In real life, the group departed Iran on a Swissair Douglas DC-8 named "Aargau".

See also
 Escape from Iran: The Canadian Caper, a 1981 television film about the "Canadian Caper".
 On Wings of Eagles, a 1983 novel by Ken Follett, about Ross Perot's successful rescue of several of his employees from Iran just after the revolution.
 Timeline of the Iranian hostage crisis

References

External links

 
 
 
 
 
 Radio interview with Ben Affleck regarding Argo, on NPR's Fresh Air'' (28 mins, 2013)

2012 films
2012 biographical drama films
2012 drama films
2010s historical films
American films based on actual events
American biographical drama films
American historical films
BAFTA winners (films)
Best Drama Picture Golden Globe winners
Best Film BAFTA Award winners
Best Foreign Film César Award winners
Best Picture Academy Award winners
Drama films based on actual events
2010s English-language films
Films about Canada–United States relations
Films about diplomats
Films about filmmaking
Films about the Central Intelligence Agency
Films based on newspaper and magazine articles
Films based on multiple works
Films based on non-fiction books
Films directed by Ben Affleck
Films produced by Ben Affleck
Films produced by George Clooney
Films produced by Grant Heslov
Films scored by Alexandre Desplat
Films set in 1979
Films set in 1980
Films set in Iran
Films set in Istanbul
Films set in Los Angeles
Films set in Tehran
Films set in Virginia
Films set in Washington, D.C.
Films set in studio lots
Films shot in Istanbul
Films shot in Los Angeles
Films shot in Turkey
Films shot in Virginia
Films shot in Washington, D.C.
Films whose director won the Best Direction BAFTA Award
Films whose director won the Best Director Golden Globe
Films whose editor won the Best Film Editing Academy Award
Films whose writer won the Best Adapted Screenplay Academy Award
Films with screenplays by Chris Terrio
GK Films films
Iran hostage crisis
Iranian Revolution films
Journalism adapted into films
Persian-language films
Political films based on actual events
Smokehouse Pictures films
Spy films based on actual events
Thriller films based on actual events
Warner Bros. films
Cultural depictions of Jimmy Carter
Films set in Langley, Virginia
Films about hostage takings
American political drama films
Film controversies
Film controversies in the United States
Film controversies in Canada
Film controversies in Iran
Casting controversies in film
Race-related controversies in film
2010s American films